L'appartement 22 is an independent, collaborative project founded by Abdellah Karroum and based in Rabat, Morocco.

The first such space in Morocco, it has since inspired a number of artist-run spaces and collectives. From its first exhibition « JF_JH individualités » in October 2002, L'appartement 22 has consistently featured challenging and exciting contemporary arts programming of international acclaim. Its artist residencies, workshops, lectures, symposia, film and video screenings, and exhibitions resonate in Rabat, throughout the country, and abroad. The art space function as a cooperative inspired by traditional systems when farmers collectively work on extraction of olive oil and its distribution allowing exchange and diversity and transfer of knowledge.

In November 2007, Karroum announced that L'appartement 22 would become the country's first cultural internet radio station R22.

L'appartement 22's authors and artists include:
 Adel ABDESSEMED, artist
 Sadik Alfraji, artist
 Mounira Al Solh
 Mustapha AKRIM
 Doa ALY
 Hamdi ATTIA
 Ismaïl Bahri, artist
 Yassine Balbzioui, artist
 Liliana BASARAB
 Fouad BELLAMINE
 Karima Boudou, Curator and Researcher
 Matti BRAUN, 
 Frédéric-Bruly BOUABRE
 Mustapha BOUJEMAOUI, Artist
 Cécile BOURNE
 Elodie CARRE
 Hassan DARSI
 Mohamed EL-BAZ, artist
 Ninar ESBER, Artist
Safaa ERRUAS
 Seamus FARRELL, Artist
 Juan A. Gaitan, Curator
 Hamza Halloubi, artist
 Mona HATOUM
 Chourouk HRIECH
 Soukaina JOUAL
 Abdellah KARROUM
 Bouchra KHALILI
 Faouzi LAATIRIS
 Antoni MUNTADAS
 Bernard PLOSSU, photographer
 Catherine PONCIN
 Karim RAFI
 Younès RAHMOUM
 Hany RASHED
 Pascal SEMUR, designer and artist
 Batoul S’HIMI, 
 Jérôme SCHLOMOFF, photographer
 Jean-Paul THIBEAU, artist
 Natalia Valencia, Curator

Notes

External links
''L'appartement 22'''s official web site
R22 art radio www.radioappartement22.com 

Rabat